Papyrus 34 (in the Gregory-Aland numbering), designated by 𝔓34, is a copy of the New Testament in Greek. It is a papyrus manuscript of the Pauline epistles, it contains 1 Cor 16:4-7.10; 2 Cor 5:18-21; 10:13-14; 11:2.4.6-7. The manuscript paleographically has been assigned to the 7th century.

The Greek text of this codex is a representative of the Alexandrian text-type. Aland placed it in Category II.

It is currently housed at the Österreichische Nationalbibliothek (P. Vindob. G. 39784) in Vienna.

See also 

 List of New Testament papyri

References

Further reading 

 Carl Wessely, Studien zur Paläographie und Papyruskunde XII, (Leipzig 1912), p. 246. 
 Ellwood M. Schofield, The Papyrus Fragments of the Greek New Testament, Southern Baptist Theological Seminary, Louisville, 1936, pp. 246–252.

External links 
 GA Papyrus 34. Center for the Study of New Testament Manuscripts

New Testament papyri
7th-century biblical manuscripts
Biblical manuscripts of the Austrian National Library
First Epistle to the Corinthians papyri
Second Epistle to the Corinthians papyri